Carnage was a Swedish death metal band whose members later went on to found Dismember and Arch Enemy. The band was formed by Michael Amott and Johan Liiva in 1988. They released only one album before dissolving in 1991.

History
Carnage was founded at the end of 1988 by Michael Amott and Johan Liiva in Växjö, Sweden. They released two-widely traded demos  The Day Man Lost and Infestation of Evil in 1989. Plagued by lineup changes, Carnage eventually released their only album, Dark Recollections in 1990 when Michael Amott was the sole remaining founding member. The album was released as a split CD with Cadaver's Hallucinating Anxiety on Necrosis Records, a subdivision of Earache Records, and was re-released with bonus tracks in 2000.

Michael Amott went on to join Carcass, and later formed Arch Enemy (with Johan Liiva) and Spiritual Beggars. Matti Kärki, David Blomqvist, and Fred Estby went on to reform Dismember.

Discography
 The Day Man Lost (1989 demo)
 Live in Stockholm (1989 EP)
 Infestation of Evil (1989 demo)
 Dark Recollections (1990)

Members
 Michael Amott - guitar (1988–1990)
 Matti Kärki - vocals (1989–1990)
 Fred Estby - drums (1989–1990)
 David Blomqvist - guitar (1989–1990)
 Johnny Dordevic - bass (1989–1990)
 Johan Liiva - bass, vocals (1988)
 Jeppe Larsson - drums (1988)

References

Swedish death metal musical groups
Musical groups established in 1988
Musical groups disestablished in 1991
Earache Records artists
Musical quintets
Musical groups from Stockholm
Grindcore musical groups